Le Bistro Montage, or simply Montage, was a restaurant in Portland, Oregon, United States.

Description and history
Characterized as quirky, and long a favorite of the late night crowd, it featured communal dining and eclectic Cajun fare such as alligator, frog legs, and jambalaya served late into the night. Originally on Belmont Street, it later moved to larger quarters at the site of the former Royal Hotel under the Morrison Bridge.

The restaurant closed in June 2020, during the COVID-19 pandemic. The food cart Montage ala Cart opened in the Hawthorne Asylum.

See also
 COVID-19 pandemic in Portland, Oregon
 Impact of the COVID-19 pandemic on the restaurant industry in the United States
 List of Cajun restaurants
 List of defunct restaurants of the United States

References

External links
 
 

2020 disestablishments in Oregon
Buckman, Portland, Oregon
Culture of Portland, Oregon
Defunct Cajun restaurants in the United States
Defunct restaurants in Portland, Oregon
Food carts in Portland, Oregon
Restaurants disestablished during the COVID-19 pandemic
Restaurants disestablished in 2020